The Ramesses III prisoner tiles are a collection of Egyptian faience depicting prisoners of war, found in Ramesses III's palaces at Medinet Habu (adjacent to the Mortuary Temple at Medinet Habu) and Tell el-Yahudiyeh. Large numbers of faience tiles have been found in these areas by sebakh-diggers since 1903; the best known are those depicting foreign people or prisoners. Many were found in excavated rubbish heaps.

They are considered of significant historical and ethnographical interest, given the representation of neighbouring populations during the Twentieth Dynasty of Egypt (1189 BC–1077 BC).

Most are in the Egyptian Museum in Cairo, as well as the Museum of Fine Arts, Boston.

Description

Location and size

Tiles were found in 1870 at Tell el-Yahoudieh and in 1903 in Medinet Habu.

In all the tiles, the prisoners are shown standing up. In some tiles, the soles of the prisoners' feet rest on the ground; in others they may be interpreted as running or hanging. The prisoners' arms are often tied, and in other tiles a white and black rope with acorns at the ends is shown around the neck.

Identification and provenance
In his 1911 paper on the tiles, French Egyptologist Georges Daressy, of the Egyptian Museum in Cairo, noted that the tiles have no inscriptions, so identification of the peoples shown required a comparison of the drawings with previously known temple bas-reliefs or tomb paintings, giving some uncertainty:

Unfortunately, there is no inscription on these tiles fixing the name of the peoples represented; we are forced to compare with the bas-reliefs of the temples or the paintings of the tombs to find a similar type and we are sometimes perplexed.

Formal excavation work at Medinet Habu by the Egyptian Antiquities Service (EAS) ended in 1899, but work continued by local fellahin sebakh-diggers (sebakh is the nitrogen-rich remains of ancient mud brick, dug up to be used as fertilizer). In 1903, the fellahin discovered remains of overturned doorways, still partly covered with their original decoration in enamelled tiles. Some pieces disappeared, but most were collected by the "ghafirs" and sent by Howard Carter, then Chief Inspector of the EAS in Upper Egypt, to the Cairo Museum, together with four of the pillars and an overdoor to which they had belonged. The Egyptian Museum tablets are numbered JE 36261 a-b, 36271, 36399, 36440 a-c, 36441 a-c, 36457 a-k, as well as one prior to the 1903 accessions numbered JE 27525.

The Boston Museum of Fine Arts noted in 1908 that the tiles' "provenance is a matter of question". They were purchased in 1903 on behalf of the museum by Albert Lythgoe from Luxor-based antiquities dealer Mohamed Mohassib; the purchase was made as part of a group (03.1566-03.1577; 03.1578a-i).

Gallery

Bibliography

General sources

Medinet Habu tiles
 
 
 Eduard Meyer, "Bericht über eine Expedition nach Ägypten zur Erforschung der Darstellungen der Fremdvölker" (Preussische Akademie der Wissenschaften, Berlin, Sitzungsberichte, 1913, pp. 769-801) Nos. 1-11.
 
 Capart, Documents pour servir à l'étude de l'art égyptien II (Paris, 1931) Pl. 77.

Tell el-Yahoudieh tiles
 Émile Brugsch, 1886, On et Onion, Recueil de travaux, volume VII, p.1
 Thomas Hayter Lewis, 1881, Tel el-Yahoudeh, Transactions of the Society of Biblical Archaeology, volume VII, p.177

References

External links 

 One of the tiles at the Museum of Fine Arts, Boston

12th-century BC works
Ancient Egyptian pottery
Egyptian Museum
Museum of Fine Arts, Boston
Ramesses III